Rhescuporis (also Rascypolis, Rhascoupolis, Rhascupolis) may refer to:

Kings of Thrace
 Rhescuporis I, Odrysian King of Thrace, 240 to 215 BC
 Rhescuporis I (Sapaean), Sapaean King of Thrace, 48 to 41 BC
 Rhescuporis II, Odrysian-Astaean King of Thrace, 18 BC to 13 BC
 Rhescuporis II (Sapaean), Sapaean King of Thrace, 12 to 18

Roman Client Kings of the Bosporan Kingdom
 Tiberius Julius Rhescuporis I, ruled from 14 until 42
 Tiberius Julius Rhescuporis II, ruled from 78 until 93
 Tiberius Julius Rhescuporis III, ruled from 211 until 218
 Tiberius Julius Rhescuporis IV, ruled from 233 until 234
 Tiberius Julius Rhescuporis V, ruled from 240 until 276
 Tiberius Julius Rhescuporis VI, ruled from 314 until 341